The 1974 UCI Track Cycling World Championships were the World Championship for track cycling. They took place between 14–20 August 1974 on a temporary velodrome at the Université de Montréal in Montreal, Quebec, Canada. Eleven events were contested, 9 for men (3 for professionals, 6 for amateurs) and 2 for women.

Medal summary

Medal table

See also
 1974 UCI Road World Championships

References

Track cycling
UCI Track Cycling World Championships by year
International cycle races hosted by Canada
1974 in track cycling
Sports competitions in Montreal
August 1974 sports events in Canada
1970s in Montreal
1974 in Quebec